Marwan Kassab-Bachi  (1934-2016) (Arabic: مروان قصاب باشي ), known as Marwan, was a German painter of Syrian origin. After being born in Damascus, Syria, he spent most of his life in Berlin, Germany.

Further reading 
 
Marwan Kassab-Bachi by Omar Kholeif
Modern Art (from the Middle East)

References

External links 

1934 births
2016 deaths
People from Damascus
Artists from Berlin
Syrian painters
Neo-expressionist artists